Stenosfemuraia pilosa is a species of spider in the family Pholcidae. It was first described in 2005 by González-Sponga as Codazziella pilosa. In 2017, it was transferred to Stenosfemuraia and Chichiriviche costanero was synonymized with it. The species is endemic to Venezuela.

References

Pholcidae
Spiders of South America
Spiders described in 2005
Endemic fauna of Venezuela